The 1915–16 Colgate men's ice hockey season was the inaugural season of play for the program.

Season
Colgate played their first varsity game of ice hockey, defeating in-state Rensselaer Polytechnic 6–1.

Note: Colgate's athletic teams did not have a moniker until 'Red Raiders' was adopted in 1932.

Roster

Standings

Schedule and Results

|-
!colspan=12 style=";" | Regular Season

References

Colgate Raiders men's ice hockey seasons
Colgate
Colgate
Colgate
Colgate